Fox Cricket is an Australian subscription television channel dedicated to screening cricket (both domestic and international) matches and related programming. It is owned by Fox Sports Pty Limited and is available throughout Australia on Foxtel. The channel was launched on 17 September 2018.

History
Since its launch in 1995 as Premier Sports Network, Fox Sports has been broadcaster to most of Australian international tours despite lacking domestic Australian international rights which has been a mainstay at the Nine Network since 1979. The first major cricket event that was broadcast on PSN was Australia’s tour of the West Indies in 1995 which was also the first on pay television in Australia. Nine who up to 1995 had broadcast on free-to-air had tried to keep off PTV  under Australia's anti-siphoning rules, which rules that certain events cannot be screened exclusively on pay television. Ultimately a deal was signed with Network Ten to the broadcast series on FTA while also being on PTV with PSN. From 2005/06 to 2012/13 Fox Sports had exclusive rights to domestic cricket in Australia including most or all of the then Ford Ranger One-Day cup and KFC Big Bash T20 matches including the first 2 seasons of the Big Bash League along with the final of the Sheffield Shield, Fox also had highlights of international men’s Test, ODI and T20 matches in Australia. In 2013, Fox Sports lost the rights of the BBL to Network Ten and the Ryobi One-Day Cup to the Nine Network for the next 5 years with international cricket in Australia remaining on Nine. Most overseas cricket broadcast stayed on Fox except for Ashes tours of England which Nine had exclusive rights to while the 2015 ICC Cricket World Cup which was held in Australia was broadcast on Fox Sports along with Nine.

In April 2018, Fox Sports came to a six-year agreement with Cricket Australia that expanded their previous coverage of cricket on the Foxtel platform. This deal formed a part of Cricket Australia's six year overall coverage deal which also includes free to air coverage by Channel Seven.

In early May, Foxtel announced the upcoming creation of a dedicated channel, Fox Cricket, featuring the entire Australian Summer of international cricket from 2018 and 2019 including tests, one day matches and T20 matches as well as the Big Bash Leagues and World Cups. The channel debuted on 17 September 2018, with the 2018 Caribbean Premier League final being the first live match broadcast.

Programming

Event coverage
Sports programming on Fox Cricket includes the following:
 Australian national cricket team
 International Test Cricket (shared with Seven Network)
 One-day Internationals
 Twenty20 Internationals
 International Women's Test Cricket (shared with Seven Network)
 Women's One-day Internationals (shared with Seven Network)
 Women's Twenty20 Internationals (shared with Seven Network)
 Australia A tour matches
 Australian domestic leagues
 Sheffield Shield selected matches including final
 Marsh One-Day Cup, selected matches including finals
 BBL every game including finals, (shared with Seven Network)
 WBBL every game including finals, (shared with Seven Network)
 Home series of other national teams
 England cricket team (except for the 2023 Ashes series which will be covered by the Nine Network)
 West Indies cricket team
 New Zealand cricket team
 South African cricket team
 Pakistan cricket team
 Sri Lankan cricket team
 Indian cricket team
 Ireland cricket team
 Zimbabwe cricket team
 Other tournaments
 ICC Cricket World Cup
 ICC T20 World Cup
 Super Smash
 Indian Premier League
 SA20
 T20 Blast
 Caribbean Premier League
 Bangladesh Premier League
 Pakistan Super League
 Major League Cricket
 International League T20
 Global T20
 20 Series
 Nepal T20 League
 Hong Kong T20 Blitz

Special events
 Australian Cricket Awards

News and analysis programming
Fox Cricket will air several studio shows including the programs listed below:
 B4 The Bash! (2018–present)
 Come In Spinner (2018–2020)
 Crash The Bash (2016–2020)
 Cricket 360 (2018–2019)
 Cricket A.M. (2018–present)
 Cricket Legends (2015–present, no new episodes)
 Fox Cricket Classics (2018–present, highlights from yesteryear)
 Tea For Two (2018–2020)
 Test Cricket Live On Fox (2018–2020)
 Test Day (2018–2020)
 The Big Break (2018–present)
 The Blast (2019–present)
 The Cricket Tragic (2018–2018)
 The Night Watchmen (2018–2020)

Personnel
Media outlets announced a number of key hosting and commentary personnel in the lead up to the 2018-19 cricket season.

Network personalities and the media attended the launch for Fox Cricket on 9 October 2018. Further key hosting personnel were announced, in addition to new programming for the forthcoming summer.

Commentators
Alex Blackwell (Expert Analyst, 2018–present)
Allan Border (Expert Analyst, 1999–present)
Adam Gilchrist (Host, Caller & Expert Analyst, 2018–present)
Isa Guha (Host, Caller, 2018–present)
Brad Haddin (Expert Analyst, 2019–present)
Mark Howard (Host, Caller, 2018–present)
Michael Hussey (Expert Analyst, 2018–present)
Mel Jones (Caller & Expert Analyst, 2018–present)
Brendon Julian (Host, Caller, 2004–present)
Brett Lee (Caller & Expert Analyst, 2018–present)
Darren Lehmann (Expert Analyst, 2018–present)
Chris Lynn (Expert Analyst, 2019–present)
Adam Peacock (Caller, 2019–present)
Brenton Speed (Caller, 2021–present)
Morne Morkel (Expert Analyst, 2021/22–present)
Stuart Clark (Expert Analyst, 2020/21–present)
Kerry O'Keeffe (Expert Analyst, 2017–present)
Rob Quiney (Expert Analyst, 2018–present)
Ian Smith (caller, 2019–20, 2022-present)
Michael Vaughan (Expert Analyst, 2013, 2018–present)
David Warner (Expert Analyst, 2019–present)
Mark Waugh (Expert Analyst, 2005–2013, 2018–present)

International commentators
Wasim Akram (expert analyst, 2019)
Russel Arnold (expert analyst, 2019)
Harsha Bhogle (caller, 2018–present)
Graeme Smith (expert analyst, 2018)
Ian Smith (caller, 2019–20)
Brian Lara (expert analyst, 2022)
Shaun Pollock (expert analyst, 2022/23)

Presenters
Sarah Jones (Host, 2009–2013, 2015, 2018–present)
Megan Barnard (Host, Reporter, 2018–present)
Kath Loughnan (Host, Reporter, 2018–present)

Former commentators
John Hastings (Expert Analyst, 2018–19) 
Ian Healy (Expert Analyst, 2018–19)
Mitchell Johnson (Expert Analyst, 2018–19)
Neroli Meadows (Host, Reporter, 2015–19)
Shane Warne (Expert Analyst, 2018–2022)
Tom Morris (Caller, Reporter 2018–2022)
Andrew Symonds (Expert Analyst, 2011–2013, 2018–2022)

Hosts

The Big Break
Mark Howard (2018–present)
Isa Guha (2018–present)

Come In Spinner
Mark Howard (2018–present)
Kerry O'Keeffe (2018–present)

Test Day
Isa Guha (2018–present)
Brendon Julian (2019–present)

Cricket Legends
Robert 'Crash' Craddock (2015–present)

Cricket A.M.
Jim Callinan (2018–present)
Kath Loughnan (2019–present)
Neroli Meadows (2018–2019)

Crash The Bash
Lee Carseldine (2016–present)

Fox Cricket Classics
Mark Howard (2018–present)

The Cricket Tragic 
Gus Worland (2018–present)

The Blast
Megan Barnard (2019–present)
Mel Jones (2019–present)

The Night Watchmen 
James 'The Professor' Rochford (2018–present)
Andrew 'Barney' Barnett (2018–present)
Nick Rado (2019–present)
Sam Taunton (2018–2019)
Kath Loughnan (2018–2019)

Commentators

Men's internationals 
Current

 Kath Loughnan (Reporter) 2019/20–present
 Allan Border (Expert Analyst) 2018/19–
 Adam Gilchrist (Host, Caller & Expert Analyst) 2018/19–
 Isa Guha (Host, Caller) 2018/19–
 Brad Haddin (Expert Analyst) 2019/20–
 Mark Howard (Host, Caller) 2018/19–
 Michael Hussey (Expert Analyst) 2018/19–
 Mel Jones (Caller & Expert Analyst) 2018/19–
 Brendon Julian (Host, Caller) 2018/19–
 Brett Lee (Caller & Expert Analyst) 2018/19–
 Kerry O'Keeffe (Expert Analyst) 2018/19–
 Michael Vaughan (Expert Analyst) 2018/19–2019/20, 2021/22–present
 Mark Waugh (Expert Analyst) 2018/19–

Past

 Neroli Meadows (Reporter) 2018/19
 Ian Healy (Expert Analyst) 2018/19
 David Warner (Expert Analyst, 2018/19)
 Wasim Akram (International Expert Analyst) 2019/20
 Russel Arnold (International Expert Analyst) 2018/19
 Graeme Smith (International Expert Analyst) 2018/19
 Ian Smith (International Caller) 2019/20
 Harsha Bhogle (International Caller) 2018/19, 2020/21
 Shane Warne (Expert Analyst) 2018/19-2021/22
 Andrew Symonds (Expert Analyst) 2018/19–2021/22

Women's internationals 
Current

 Megan Barnard (Host) 2018/19–
 Mel Jones (Analysis) 2018/19–
 Alex Blackwell (Analysis) 2018/19–
 Kirby Short (Analysis) 2021/22–

Past

 Sarah Aley (Analysis) 2020/21
 Elyse Villani 2020/21

Australian domestic limited-overs cricket tournament
Present
 Brendon Julian (Host) 2018/19–
 Adam Peacock (Caller) 2019/20–
 Brenton Speed (Caller) 2021/22–
 Kerry O'Keeffe (Expert Analyst) 2018/19–
 Morne Morkel (Expert Analyst) 2021/22–
 Stuart Clark (Expert Analyst) 2021/22–
Past

 Allan Border (Expert Analyst) 2018/19–
 Brad Haddin (Expert Analyst) 2019/20–
 Mark Howard (Host, Caller) 2018/19–
 Michael Hussey (Expert Analyst) 2018/19–
 Mel Jones (Caller & Expert Analyst) 2018/19–
 Brett Lee (Caller & Expert Analyst) 2018/19–
 Andrew Symonds (Expert Analyst) 2018/19–
 Mark Waugh (Expert Analyst 2018/19–
 John Hastings (Expert Analyst, 2018/19–
 Alyssa Healy (Expert Analyst,  2018/19–
 Darren Lehmann (Expert Analyst, 2018–present)
 Chris Lynn (Expert Analyst, 2019–present)
 Corbin Middlemas (Caller, 2019/20)
 Tom Morris (Caller, 2018–present)
 Rob Quiney (Expert Analyst, 2018–present)

Big Bash League 
Present

Callum Ferguson (Expert Analyst, 2019–present), Big Bash
John Hastings (Expert Analyst, 2018–present) Marsh Cup
Alyssa Healy (Expert Analyst, 2018–present) Marsh Cup
Darren Lehmann (Expert Analyst, 2018–present)
Chris Lynn (Expert Analyst, 2019–present)
Corbin Middlemas (Caller, 2019–present)
Adam Peacock (Caller, 2019–present)
Rob Quiney (Expert Analyst, 2018–present)

Women's Big Bash League 
Current

 Megan Barnard (Host/Sideline Reporter) 2018/19–
 Mel Jones (Host/Caller/Expert Commentator/Analysis) 2018/19–
 Brenton Speed (Caller) 2021/22–
 Ben Homer (Caller) 2021/22–
 Alex Blackwell (Expert Commentator) 2018/19–
 Erin Burns (Expert Commentator/Analysis) 2020/21–
 Morne Morkel (Expert Commentator) 2021/22–
 Mel Farrell (Expert Commentator) 2021/22–
 Adam Peacock (Caller) 2021/22–

Past

 Isa Guha (Host) 2018/19–2019/20
 Ian Healy (Analysis) 2018/19
 Meg Lanning (Analysis) 2018/19
 Holly Ferling (Sideline Reporter) 2019/20
 Molly Strano (Analysis) 2020/21

World cups 
2018 Women's T20 World Cup
 Neroli Meadows (Host)
 Alex Blackwell (Analysis)
 Mel Jones (Analysis)
 Darren Lehmann (Analysis)
 Isa Guha (Host/Analysis)
 Alex Blackwell (Analysis)
2019 Cricket World Cup
 Brendon Julian (Host)
 Tom Morris (Host)
 Andrew Symonds (Analysis)
 Allan Border (Analysis)
 Mark Waugh (Analysis)
 Adam Gilchrist (Analysis)
 Brett Lee (Analysis)
 Kerry O'Keeffe (Analysis)
 Chris Lynn (Analysis)
2020 Women's T20 World Cup
 Megan Barnard (Host)
 Mel Jones (Host/Analysis)
 Isa Guha (Host/Analysis)
 Alex Blackwell (Analysis)
2021 Men's T20 World Cup
 Brendon Julian (Host)
 Mark Waugh (Analysis)
 Kerry O'Keeffe (Analysis)
 Brett Lee (Analysis)
 Brad Haddin (Analysis)

See also

Fox League
Fox Footy
Fox Netball
Fox Sports
List of sports television channels

References

External links

Fox Sports (Australian TV network)
Television channels and stations established in 2018
2018 establishments in Australia
English-language television stations in Australia
Sports television networks in Australia
Cricket on television